Bory is a municipality in Žďár nad Sázavou District in the Vysočina Region of the Czech Republic. It has about 800 inhabitants.

Administrative parts
Bory is made up of villages of Cyrilov, Dolní Bory and Horní Bory.

References

Villages in Žďár nad Sázavou District